

Cynefrith (died  843) was a medieval Bishop of Lichfield.

Cynefrith was consecrated between 830 and 836 and died between 841 and 845.

Notes

Citations

References

External links
 

840s deaths
9th-century English bishops
Anglo-Saxon bishops of Lichfield
Year of birth unknown